Edward Howard, 1st Baron Howard of Escrick (died 24 April 1675) was an English nobleman and Parliamentarian.

Howard was the youngest son of Thomas Howard, 1st Earl of Suffolk. He was knighted KB. In 1624 he was elected Member of Parliament for Calne and for Wallingford and chose to sit for Calne. He was elected MP for Hertford in 1628 but created Baron Howard of Escrick on 12 April 1628.

Howard was one of the twelve peers who signed the petition on grievances, which he presented to Charles I at York in 1640. He was very active in the early parts of the English Civil War. He was one of the ten Lords selected to attend the Westminster Assembly of Divines along with 20 Commoners as lay assessor, and was often employed in negotiations with Scottish officials. However, he was left off the Committee of Both Kingdoms and generally seems to play less of a role in the coming years.

After the abolition of the House of Lords in 1649, he sat in the Commons as member for Carlisle, being also a member of the council of state. In 1651 he was expelled from parliament for taking bribes.

Howard married Mary Butler, daughter of John Boteler and Elizabeth Villiers, at York House on 30 November 1623. They had two sons, Thomas, 2nd Baron Howard of Escrick, who married Elizabeth Mordaunt, daughter of John Mordaunt, 1st Earl of Peterborough, and William Howard, 3rd Baron Howard of Escrick, notorious both as a rebel and as an informer and double agent.

References

thepeerage.com

Year of birth missing
1675 deaths
1
Younger sons of earls
Lay members of the Westminster Assembly
Edward Howard, 01st Baron Howard of Escrick
English MPs 1624–1625
English MPs 1628–1629
English MPs 1648–1653
Expelled members of the Parliament of the United Kingdom